For the kidney structure, see straight arterioles of kidney

Vasa recta are straight capillaries coming off from arcades in the mesentery of the jejunum and ileum, and heading toward the intestines.  

The arcades are anastomoses of the jejunal and ileal arteries, branches of superior mesenteric artery.

The vasa recta of the jejunum are long and few, compared to the ileum where they are numerous and short.

See also
 Intestinal arteries

Additional images

External links
 

Arteries of the abdomen